The Tuxedo is a 2002 American science fiction action comedy film directed by Kevin Donovan and starring Jackie Chan and Jennifer Love Hewitt. It is a spy parody that involves a special tuxedo that grants its wearer special abilities. It also involves a corporate terrorist, threatening to poison the United States' fresh water supply with bacteria that spills electrolytes into the blood and totally dehydrates the host.

The film received negative reviews from critics upon release and earned a total worldwide box office gross of $104.4 million.

Plot 
James "Jimmy" Tong is a taxi driver notorious for his speed and ability to get his customers anywhere in the least amount of time. His reputation lands him a job as the personal chauffeur of the mysterious but wealthy Clark Devlin. Jimmy does not really know what his new boss' job is, but Devlin's friendly nature, imperturbable demeanor, and willingness to offer Jimmy advice wins Jimmy over and the two become friends. What Jimmy does not realize is that Devlin is a secret spy and undercover government agent, and when an attempt to kill Devlin with a car bombing sends him into a coma, Jimmy ends up with Devlin's recent case notes and a special watch that controls Devlin's rather unusual tuxedo.

The tuxedo is a gadget capable of granting its wearer special abilities (including martial arts, speed, the ability to dance, and various acrobatics) which Jimmy must use to stop the criminal organization responsible for Devlin's attempted murder. The group is a terrorist organization disguised as a corporation named Banning Corporation and is headed by the notorious and ruthless Dietrich Banning. Its goal is to take over the global drinking water supply, starting with the poisoning of major US reservoirs by means of genetically modified water strider insects. These water striders have bacteria that can spread from person to person, causing severe dehydration. By pure chance, Jimmy is joined by a genius scientist with aspirations of field work, Delilah "Del" Blaine. Blaine is completely new to field work and is delighted to be on assignment with Devlin, only to be very confused by Jimmy as he impersonates Devlin, relying on the tuxedo's special abilities to compensate for his lack of skill and training.

At first, Blaine thinks Jimmy is weird and annoying, and then a fraud when Jimmy's impersonation is finally exposed. She confiscates his borrowed tuxedo and attempts to stop the evil Dietrich Banning on her own by feigning a desire to become a turncoat for Banning Corporation. Meanwhile, Jimmy is ready to give up and go back to his life as a taxi driver, but while packing his belongings he discovers that Devlin had ordered a second suit for Jimmy himself, believing that Jimmy could also be a great agent. Using his new suit, Jimmy defeats the villain, Banning, by putting a cigarette in Blaine's mouth. Banning's tuxedo automatically forces him to pull out a lighter and light her cigarette. While Blaine is (comically) puffing on the lit cigarette, Jimmy begins to punch Banning. During the fight, Jimmy throws a glass containing the queen of the water striders into Banning's mouth. He is then infected with bacteria from the water strider. The other remaining water striders attack Banning and he then dies instantaneously.

As compensation for his role in bringing down Banning, the organization uses its resources to orchestrate an operation so that Jimmy can finally meet his dream girl. However, confused by Blaine's and the now-recovered Devlin's conflicting instructions on how to act Jimmy succeeds only in alarming the girl into threatening to mace him, resulting in the operation being aborted. Consoling Jimmy afterwards, Blaine admits feeling sad that no one had ever tried to do for her what Jimmy had just done, and Jimmy tells Blaine that she has to change and be more accommodating if she ever wants to have a boyfriend. Feeling a tentative attraction for each other, they walk away to buy coffee together.

Cast 
 Jackie Chan as Jimmy Tong / Clark Devlin
 Jennifer Love Hewitt as CSA Agent Delilah "Del" Blaine
 Jason Isaacs as CSA Agent Clark Devlin / Brad Dillford (Inspired by Ian Fleming's James Bond)
 Debi Mazar as CSA Agent Steena
 Ritchie Coster as Dietrich Banning
 Peter Stormare as Dr. Simms
 Mia Cottet as Cheryl
 Romany Malco as Mitch
 Daniel Kash as Rogers
 Jody Racicot as Kells
 Boyd Banks as Vic
 Bob Balaban as CSA Director Winton Chalmers (uncredited)
 Christian Potenza as CSA Agent Joel
 Scott Wickware as CSA Agent Wallace
 Karen Glave as CSA Agent Randa
 Scott Yaphe as CSA Agent Gabe
 Jordan Madley as Holly 
 James Brown as himself 
 Colin Mochrie as Gallery Owner
 Noah Danby as Bike Messenger
 Kim Roberts as ER Nurse

Production 
Jackie Chan was unsure about the project adding special effects together with stunts, but was interested to work with DreamWorks for the chance to meet Steven Spielberg. Chan found the American approach to stunts and safety restrictive and wanted to repeat a jump but was not allowed. "American films are different -- it drives me crazy," said Chan. On her first day of stunts, Jennifer Love Hewitt suffered a broken finger after being struck by one of the stunt men.

Principal photography began in September 2001 and ended in January 2002. During filming in Toronto, Chan and Love Hewitt appeared on an on-set webcam and interacted with fans.

Chan worked on The Tuxedo in between shooting The Medallion, which started before, and completed shooting later.

Soundtrack
After an initial score by Christophe Beck, John Debney was brought in to rescore the film (incorporating Beck's thematic material). Both composers ultimately had cues included in the final version.

Varèse Sarabande released a soundtrack album on October 1, 2002, including different cues written by the composers for the same scenes. Cues by Debney are in italics, cues by Beck in bold.

 Jimmy's Tux (2:50)
 Skateboard Chase (2:00)
 Mad Bike Messenger (1:04)
 Jimmy's Dream (:48)
 Main Title - "The Tuxedo" (3:01)
 First Mission (2:54)
 Swallow The Queen (2:25)
 Demolition (1:20)
 Putting on Tux (1:59)
 Demolition Program (1:02)
 Rope Fight (2:58)
 Rope Fight (2:14)
 Superhuman (1:39)
 Walter Strider (1:21)
 High Noon (:49)
 Banning Opens The Pods (2:29)
 Banning Swallows Queen (:49)
 Jimmy Saves Blaine (1:50)
 Get Up (I Feel Like Being a Sex Machine) - James Brown (3:19)

Reception

Box office 
On a reported budget of $60 million, the film grossed $50.5 million in the United States. In its opening weekend the film grossed $15 million from 3,022 theaters. The film's total worldwide gross is $104.4 million.

Critical response 
On Rotten Tomatoes, the film has an approval rating of 21% based on 140 reviews and an average rating of 4.33/10. The site's critical consensus reads, "Chan is as charming as ever, but his talents are squandered by special effects and bad writing." On Metacritic, the film has a score of 30 out of 100 based on 27 critics, indicating "generally unfavorable reviews". Audiences polled by CinemaScore gave the film an average grade of "B" on an A+ to F scale.

Roger Ebert of the Chicago Sun-Times commented that "The movie is silly beyond comprehension, and even if it weren't silly, it would still be beyond comprehension" but does comment that the film has its good moments. He gave the film one and a half stars out of four. Robert Koehler of Variety magazine says that the film's central problem is the mix of Chan's actual stunts and effects, which plays against Chan's whole career and hard-core commitment to doing all of his own body-defying stunts. He notes that Hewitt "has displayed a Chan-like sweetness herself in past roles" and is disappointed that her character is "a haggling, high-strung shrew who’s instantly repellent" rather than an amusing sidekick as Chan has had in other Hollywood films. Koehler also criticizes the "pallid direction", and "virtually incomprehensible plot line". American film critic Wheeler Winston Dixon described the trademark action comedy as having an "unlikely pairing" of Jennifer Love Hewitt with Chan, and noted that Chan's doing his own stunts, even in his middle age, added a "welcome touch of verisimilitude to the endless succession of doubles who normally populate such films."

Novelization
A novelization of the film was released by publisher Price Stern Sloan adapted by Ellen Weiss.

See also
 List of films featuring powered exoskeletons

References

External links
Dreamworks SKG page
Jackie Chan interview for The Tuxedo

2002 films
2002 action comedy films
2002 comedy films
2002 directorial debut films
2002 martial arts films
2000s martial arts comedy films
2000s spy comedy films
American action comedy films
American martial arts comedy films
DreamWorks Pictures films
Films about terrorism
Films produced by John H. Williams
Films scored by Christophe Beck
Films scored by John Debney
Films shot in Toronto
Films with screenplays by Matt Manfredi
Films with screenplays by Michael J. Wilson
Films with screenplays by Phil Hay (screenwriter)
Parody films based on James Bond films
2000s English-language films
2000s American films